Dámaso Pérez Prado (December 11, 1916 – September 14, 1989) was a Cuban bandleader, pianist, composer and arranger who popularized the mambo in the 1950s. His big band adaptation of the danzón-mambo proved to be a worldwide success with hits such as "Mambo No. 5", earning him the nickname "King of the Mambo". In 1955, Prado and his orchestra topped the charts in the US and UK with a mambo cover of Louiguy's "Cherry Pink (and Apple Blossom White)". He frequently made brief appearances in films, primarily of the rumberas genre, and his music was featured in films such as La Dolce Vita.

Pérez Prado began his career as pianist and arranger for the Sonora Matancera, an internationally successful dance music ensemble from his hometown of Matanzas. He later established his own group and made several recordings in Havana in 1946, including "Trompetiana", a self-penned mambo and one of the first examples arranged for big band. He then moved to Mexico where he developed this particular genre in multiple forms, including bolero-mambo (with María Luisa Landín), guaracha-mambo (with Benny Moré) and two forms of instrumental mambo he created: mambo batiri and mambo kaen. The success of his 1949 recordings landed him a contract with RCA Victor in the US, which led to a prolific career in the 1950s. His number 1 hit "Cherry Pink" was followed by other charting singles, such as a cover of "Guaglione" and his own "Patricia", both released in 1958. In the 1960s, Pérez Prado's popularity waned with the advent of other Latin dance rhythms such as pachanga and, later, boogaloo. Despite several innovative albums and a new form of mambo he called "dengue", Pérez Prado moved back to Mexico in the 1970s, where he became a naturalized citizen in 1980. He died there in 1989. His son, Pérez Jr., continues to direct the Pérez Prado Orchestra in Mexico City to this day.

Biography

Early life
Dámaso Pérez Prado was born in Matanzas, Cuba, on December 11, 1916; his mother Sara Prado was a school teacher, his father Pablo Pérez a journalist at El Heraldo de Cuba. He studied classical piano in his early childhood, and later played organ and piano in local clubs. For a time, he was pianist and arranger for the Sonora Matancera, Cuba's best-known musical group at the time. He also worked with casino orchestras in Havana for most of the 1940s. He was nicknamed "El Cara de Foca" ("Seal Face") by his peers at the time.

In 1949, Pérez Prado moved to Mexico where he formed his own band and signed a recording contract with the International  division of RCA Victor in Mexico City. He quickly specialized in mambos, an upbeat adaptation of the Cuban danzón. Pérez Prado's mambos stood out among the competition, with their fiery brass riffs and strong saxophone counterpoints, and most of all, his trademark grunts (he actually says "¡Dilo! ("Say it!") in many of the perceived grunts). In 1950, arranger Sonny Burke heard "Qué rico el mambo" while on vacation in Mexico and recorded it back in the United States. The single was a hit, which led Pérez Prado to launch a US tour. He was to record the song again some years later under the title "Mambo Jambo". Pérez Prado's appearances in 1951 were sell-outs. RCA Victor record producers Herman Diaz Jr. and Ethel Gabriel signed Pérez Prado to RCA Victor in the US and produced his best-selling recording of "Cherry Pink and Apple Blossom White.

Pérez Prado and his Orchestra performed at the famed tenth Cavalcade of Jazz concert held at Wrigley Field in Los Angeles which was produced by Leon Hefflin, Sr. on June 20, 1954.

Famous pieces
Pérez Prado is the composer of such famous pieces as "Mambo No. 5" (later a UK chart-topper for both Lou Bega in 1999 and animated character Bob the Builder in 2001) and "Mambo No. 8". The mambo craze peaked in the US in  1955, when Pérez Prado hit the American charts at number one with a cha-cha-chá version of "Cherry Pink (and Apple Blossom White)" (composed by French composer Louiguy). This arrangement, featuring trumpeter Billy Regis, held the spot for 10 consecutive weeks, sold over one million copies, and was awarded a gold disc. The song also went to number one in the UK and in Germany. Pérez Prado had first recorded this title for the movie Underwater! in 1954, where Jane Russell can be seen dancing to "Cherry Pink (and Apple Blossom White)". In 1958 one of Pérez Prado's own compositions, "Patricia", became the last record to ascend to No. 1 on the Jockeys and Top 100 charts, both of which gave way the following week to the then newly introduced Billboard Hot 100 chart, where in its first week had the song at #2 behind Ricky Nelson's "Poor Little Fool." The song also went to number one in Germany, and in the UK it reached number eight. The Italian filmmaker Federico Fellini chose to play "Patricia" twice in his 1960 masterpiece, La Dolce Vita, in the restaurant on the beach and during the striptease scene.

International popularity
Pérez Prado's popularity in the United States matched the peak of the first wave of interest in Latin music outside the Hispanic and Latino communities during the 1940s, 1950s and early 1960s. He also performed in films in the United States and Europe, as well as in Mexican cinema (Rumberas film), always with his trademark goatee and turtle-neck sweaters and vests. 

At the height of his popularity in Mexico, Pérez Prado was unexpectedly deported from that country in 1953 and wouldn't be able to return until 1964. A popular legend among Mexicans is that he was deported for having done a mambo arrangement of the Mexican National Anthem, which would have constituted a crime under Mexican law. However, according to journalist Iván Restrepo, the actual reason for his exile was that a Mexican businessman who had hired Pérez Prado to work at the Margo theater in Mexico City became enraged when Pérez Prado decided to work with another businessman who paid him more, prompting the first businessman to report him to the migration authorities as Pérez Prado lacked a work permit. Pérez Prado, who had just finished recording the soundtrack for the movie Cantando nace el amor, was then approached by two migration agents who asked him to show them his work permit; since he did not have the permit, Pérez Prado bribed the officers to let him finish recording the mambo Alekum Salem before being deported. His eleven-year exile came to an end after Mexican singer and actress María Victoria interceded with then-President Adolfo López Mateos to allow Pérez Prado back into Mexico.

Pérez Prado's popularity in the United States began to wane by 1960, with the new decade giving way to new rhythms, such as  rock and roll and changing trends in pop music. His association with RCA Victor ended in the mid 1960s, and afterward his recorded output was mainly limited to smaller labels with limited distribution mostly in Latin America and recycled Latin-style anthologies. After returning to Mexico, he had a final hit there with the self-penned danzón "Norma, la de Guadalajara", which topped the Mexican charts in 1968.

Later life
In the early 1970s, Pérez Prado retired to his spacious apartment off Mexico City's grand Paseo de la Reforma to live with his wife and two children, son Dámaso Pérez Salinas (known as Pérez Prado Jr.) and daughter María Engracia. While his career in the US had declined, his popularity in Latin America was still strong, and he toured and continued to record material released in Mexico, Central and South America, as well as Japan, where he was still revered as one of the reigning giants of the music industry. Prado was a regular performer on Mexican radio and  television; a live concert recording from his 1973 tour was released by RCA in Japan on LP in Quadraphonic sound.

In 1981, Pérez Prado was featured in a musical revue entitled Sun, which enjoyed a long run in Mexico City. In 1983, his brother Pantaleón Pérez Prado, a musician who was also known professionally as Pérez Prado, died, and the press erroneously reported Dámaso's death. His final appearance in the US was in Hollywood on September 12, 1987, when he played to a packed house. This was also the year of his final recording. Persistent ill health plagued him for the next two years, and he died of complications from a stroke in Mexico City on September 14, 1989, at age 72.

Legacy
Although he did not create the genre—Orestes López and his brother Cachao did in 1937—Pérez Prado has been recognized as a key figure in the refinement and popularization of mambo and Cuban dance music in general across the world in the 1950s. His success came from his adaptation of the fast mambo rhythm to the American-style big bands of the 1940s and away from the quieter Cuban charanga.

He also worked with a variety of musicians who would go on to have successful careers. In 1946, he worked with guaracha singer Orlando Guerra "Cascarita", who became one of the leading exponents of the genre. In Mexico, he helped launch the career of Beny Moré in 1949, with hits such as "Anabacoa". In America, he worked with West-Coast trumpeters such as Maynard Ferguson, Pete Candoli and Ollie Mitchell (featured on "Flight of the Bumble Bee"), trombonist-vocalist  Ray Vasquez, and a variety of percussionists, including Armando Peraza, Mongo Santamaría and Alex Acuña.

In 1999, Pérez Prado was posthumously inducted into the International Latin Music Hall of Fame.

In popular culture

Pérez Prado's mambo records and the joyous dancing they caused, are described in a later chapter of Jack Kerouac's seminal novel On the Road (1957). Many of Prado's recordings have been featured in film soundtracks. "Patricia" was included in La Dolce Vita (1960), Goodbye, Columbus (1969) and Space Cowboys (2000), as well as the episode "Some Enchanted Evening" (1990) of the animated sitcom The Simpsons. His songs "Caballo Negro", "Lupita", and "Mambo no. 8" featured in the film Santa Sangre (1989) by Alejandro Jodorowsky. His recording of "Cherry Pink (and Apple Blossom White)" featured in the films Deal of the Century (1983), Cookie (1989) and Parents (1989), and his recording of "Que Rico Mambo" was featured in The Irishman (2019).

In the decade after his death, the popularity of Pérez Prado's music was on the rise again. CD reissues of his RCA recordings continue to sell steadily. "Guaglione" peaked at number 2 in the UK Singles Chart in 1995 and reached number 1 in the Irish singles chart, following its use in the Guinness television commercial Anticipation. "Mambo No. 5" was featured in another Guinness commercial, Swimblack, in 1998 (the year before Lou Bega took his sampled cover version of that same song to the top of the UK chart).

The soundtrack to the 1997 action thriller Mean Guns heavily features the music of Pérez Prado, as it is the favorite choice of Ice T's character in the film. The soundtrack to the 1999 movie Office Space featured two of his performances, "Mambo No. 8" and "The Peanut Vendor". The soundtrack to the 2004 movie Diarios de Motocicleta featured Pérez Prado's "Qué rico el mambo", more commonly known as "Mambo Jambo".

Avant-garde musician Nurse With Wound recorded a tribute, Funeral Music for Perez Prado, exceeding 30 minutes in length.

Pérez Prado's song "La Chunga" has been used as the theme music for several versions of The Spud Goodman Show.

Discography

Singles

"April in Portugal"
"Ballin' The Jack"
"Cherry Pink (and Apple Blossom White)"
"Chicago Dengue"
"La Chula Linda"
"Claudia"
"Concierto para Bongó"
"Fantasia"
"A Go Go Mambo"

"Guaglione"
"The High and Mighty"
"Lupita"
"Mambo No. 5"
"Mambo No. 8"
"Mambo a la Kenton"
"Mambo del Politécnico"
"Mambo del Ruletero"
"Mambo en Sax"

"Mambo del Taconazo"
"Mambo en trompeta"
"Mambo Universitario"
"Marilyn Monroe Mambo"
"La Niña Popoff"
 "Paris"
"Patricia"
"Que Rico el Mambo" (aka Mambo Jambo)
 "St. Louis Blues Mambo"
"Tico, Tico, Tico"
"Tomando Café"

Albums

All albums, RCA Victor.

Pérez Prado Plays Mucho Mambo For Dancing (1951)
Voodoo Suite (1955)
Mambo By The King (1955)
Mambo Mania (1955)
Havana 3 A.M. (1956)
Latin Satin (1957)
Mambo Happy! (1958)
Dilo (Ugh!) (1958)
"Prez" (1958) - Pérez Prado's only US Top 40 album, reaching the No. 22 spot in May 1959
Pops and Prado (1959)
A Touch of Tabasco with Rosemary Clooney (1959)
Big Hits By Prado (1960)
Perez Prado's Rockambo (1961)
Latino! (1961)La Chunga (1961)Exotic Suite of the Americas (1962)Now! Twist Goes Latin (1962)Our Man In Latin America (1963)Dance Latino (1965)The Best Of Perez Prado (1967) Reissue of Big Hits By PradoThis Is Perez Prado (1971)Perez Prado - Pure Gold (1976) Another reissue of Big Hits By PradoFilmography
 Serenade in Acapulco (1951)
 Underwater! (1955)
 Cha-Cha-Cha Boom! (1956)
 Girls for the Mambo-Bar (1959)

Notes

References

Further reading
 Pérez Firmat, Gustavo. "A Brief History of Mambo Time," in Life on the Hyphen: The Cuban-American Way''. Austin: The University of Texas Press, 1994. Rpt. 1996, 1999. Revised and expanded edition, 2012.

External links
 Pérez Prado – complete discography

 
 
 Mambo, a documentary about Perez Prado

Mambo musicians
Cuban bandleaders
Cuban composers
Male composers
Cuban pianists
1916 births
1989 deaths
Big band bandleaders
Cuban emigrants to Mexico
Naturalized citizens of Mexico
Musicians from Mexico City
People from Matanzas
RCA Victor artists
20th-century composers
20th-century pianists
Cuban male musicians